CKCE-FM (101.5 FM, 101.5 Today Radio) is a radio station in Calgary. Owned by the Jim Pattison Group, it broadcasts a hot adult contemporary format.

CKCE's studios are located on 58th Avenue Southwest in Calgary, while its transmitter is located on Patina Hill Drive Southwest in the Prominence Point neighbourhood in western Calgary.

As of Winter 2020, CKCE is the third-most-listened-to radio station in the Calgary market according to a PPM data report released by Numeris.

History
The station was originally approved by the CRTC in 2006 from an application submitted by CHUM Limited (prior to the announcement of its merger with CTVglobemedia). However, because the original application requested the 90.3 frequency, which was granted instead to Newcap Broadcasting for what would become CFUL-FM, the approval was made conditional on the station submitting a revised application for a different frequency. The station subsequently applied for the 101.5 frequency, which was granted by the CRTC in January 2007.

CKCE-FM began testing on March 12, 2007 with a stunting loop of "Wannabe" by Spice Girls, and officially launched on March 22 at 1:01 p.m. with a rhythmic-leaning hot AC format as Energy 101.5. The station started leaning towards pop-rock by June 2009, when CKMP-FM, a top 40 station with a similar format to competitor CIBK-FM, was launched. Since the station rebranding as 101.5 Energy FM in early 2010, most of the rhythmic tracks returned in order to go up against hot adult contemporary radio station CIGY-FM, which plays more classic hits instead of rhythmic content.

On August 17, 2010, CKCE relaunched as Kool 101.5; the format remained Hot AC, but phased out a majority of the pop-rock hits, and began leaning rhythmic again. It continued to play pop-rock tracks for a time, but as of 2013, its playlist had become more Rhythmic/Dance driven with pop-rock product notably getting less airplay, in part due to increased competition in the market. As a result of the changes, the station suspended Mediabase reports for two months just after the station rebranded.

As part of Bell Media's acquisition of Astral Media (who owns the aforementioned CIBK), Bell chose to divest CKCE-FM to meet ownership limits. On May 16, 2013, the Jim Pattison Group announced a deal to acquire CKCE-FM and two Winnipeg stations for an undisclosed amount. CKCE-FM was consolidated into the facilities of its forthcoming sister station CHPK-FM.

On December 20, 2013, the CRTC approved Jim Pattison's acquisition of CKCE-FM; the acquisition was closed in early 2014.

With the sale, CKCE began transitioning back towards a conventional hot AC format by dropping the rhythmic lean, reduced its focus on 1980s and 1990s hits, and began adding more pop-rock currents and recurrents, as well as slightly rebranding to 101.5 Kool FM.

On February 26, 2019, the station rebranded as 101.5 Today Radio, maintaining a hot AC format and most of its airstaff, while restoring 1990s and 1980s hits to its playlist. The format carries a heavy emphasis on topical discussions and interactions between listeners and DJs. The station also added Crash and Mars from Edmonton sister station CKNO-FM in evenings.

References

External links
 
 
 

Kce
Kce
Kce
Ckce-fm
2007 establishments in Alberta